

See also
List of Savoyard consorts

 
Genoa
Genoa
Genoa